Reif Larsen (born 1980) is an American author, known for The Selected Works of T.S. Spivet, for which Vanity Fair claimed Larsen received just under a million dollars as an advance from Penguin Press following a bidding war between ten publishing houses.

Life

Larsen was born in Cambridge, Massachusetts. Both his parents were artists. He graduated from Milton Academy in 1998 and then went on to Brown University and Columbia University. He holds an M.F.A in fiction. He has also made films in the United States, the United Kingdom and the sub-Saharan desert. He currently is living in New York.

Works

Larsen's debut novel, The Selected Works of T.S. Spivet, was adapted into a 2013 film entitled The Young and Prodigious T. S. Spivet by director Jean-Pierre Jeunet.

Larsen has cited Mark Danielewski, W.G. Sebald and Gabriel García Márquez as influences.

Style
Larsen's work incorporates illustrations, diagrams, and footnotes within the text.

Bibliography
The Selected Works of T.S. Spivet (2009)
 I Am Radar (2015)

References

External links

Living people
1980 births
21st-century American novelists
American male novelists
Writers from Cambridge, Massachusetts
Milton Academy alumni
Brown University alumni
Columbia University alumni
21st-century American male writers
Novelists from Massachusetts